James Nathanson may refer to:

James Nathanson, a minor character in the American television drama 24
James E. Nathanson, politician in Washington, D.C.